Diptford is a village in the county of Devon, England. It is perched on a hill overlooking the River Avon. The name is believed to come from "deep ford", referring to the local site of a river crossing. The village is mentioned in the Domesday Book as one of the settlements in the Hundred of Diptford.

At the centre of the village is a small primary school, the parish hall and the recently redeveloped 14th-century church. A former rector of the village, Rev. William Gregor, discovered the element titanium, which he called manaccanite, in 1791.

The Dipford Cross and wall were rebuilt on 23 August 2020, by Aldridge born Craftsman and artist John Clifton.

References

External links 
 

Civil parishes in South Hams
Villages in South Hams